Margaret Kennedy (1896–1967) was an English novelist and playwright.

Margaret Kennedy may also refer to:

Margaret L. Kennedy (1892–?), Irish Fianna Fáil politician
Margaret Kennedy Knight, English psychologist and humanist
Margaret Kennedy (singer) (died 1793), contralto singer and actress
Margaret Stephen Kennedy (1814–1891), zenana missionary
Margaret Kennedy (American politician)

See also 
 Margrit Kennedy (1939–2013), German architect, professor, environmentalist and author